Sketches and Spells is an album by Julian House, under the pseudonym of The Focus Group. The album was released on CD-R in 2004 on the Ghost Box Music label.

Track listing

External links
 spells 
Stylus Magazine review

2004 albums
The Focus Group albums
Ghost Box Music albums